Prvine is a small settlement in the hills above Šentožbolt in the Municipality of Lukovica in the eastern part of the Upper Carniola region of Slovenia.

References

External links
Prvine on Geopedia

Populated places in the Municipality of Lukovica